Button brittlebush may refer to one of the following flowering plants:

Encelia frutescens
Encelia resinifera subsp. resinifera